Mount Alab is a mountain located at the West Coast Division of Sabah, Malaysia.

Geology 
The rock of the mountain consists of Late Eocene-Lower Miocene sedimentary rocks from Crocker Formation which is made of sandstone, shale and interlayered sandstone-siltstone-shale unit.

References 

Alab
Hiking trails in Malaysia
West Coast Division